"Mago" (stylized in all caps) is a song recorded by South Korean girl group GFriend for their third Korean-language studio album Walpurgis Night. The song was released as the title track of the album on November 9, 2020 by Source Music. It is the group’s final release before their departure from Source Music.

Background 
On October 31, 2020, a sneak peek of the song and its music video has been shown during the group's online concert GFriend C:ON. On the same day, members Eunha and Umji appeared on the show Knowing Bros and showcased a tip of the song and its choreography.

Composition 

The song was written and produced by FRANTS. Many other producers also participated in writing the song: "hitman" bang, Kyler Niko, Paulina Cerrilla, Cho Yoon-kyung, Alice Vicious, Cazzi Opeia, Ellen Berg, JADED JANE, Noisy Citizen, Justin Reinstein and JJean. Members Eunha, Yuju and Umji participated as well in writing lyrics for the song.

The song was described by Teen Vogue's Sara Delgado as "the most striking videos to come from GFriend to date".

Chart performance 
The song debuted at number 17 on Billboard's World Digital Song Sales and peaked at number 16 a week after. It debuted as well as number 46 on Billboard's K-pop Hot 100 for the week ending November 21, 2020. Then, it debuted at number 42 on Gaon Digital Chart for the week ending November 14, 2020. The song also placed at number 3 on the componing Download Chart and number 83 the week of the release of the song on the componing Streaming Chart.

Music video 
On October 31, 2020, a sneak peek of the music video for "Mago" was shown during the group's online concert GFriend C:ON. The music video was then released on HYBE Labels' YouTube channel on November 9, 2020, along with the album. It was directed by Guzza of Lumpens, who previously directed the music video for their previous single, "Apple".

Accolades

Charts

Weekly charts

Monthly charts

Release history

References 

2020 songs
2020 singles
GFriend songs
Disco songs
Korean-language songs
Kakao M singles
Songs written by Bang Si-hyuk
Music videos directed by Lumpens
Hybe Corporation singles